The Iranian Society of Animal Science (ISAS) is a non-profit professional organization for the advancement of livestock, companion animals, exotic animals and meat science. Founded in 2005, ISAS is headquartered in Tehran. Journal of Livestock Science and Technologies is the official journal of the Iranian Society of Animal Sciences.

References

External links
 

Livestock
2005 establishments in Iran
Food technology organizations
Organisations based in Tehran
Clubs and societies in Iran